Antoine Léonard Thomas (1 October 1732 – 17 September 1785) was a French poet and literary critic, best known in his time for his great eloquence, especially for éloges in praise of past luminaries. It was in recognition of this that he was elected to Académie Française.

In an award-winning 1765 essay in praise of René Descartes, he penned a fuller form of the cogito in French as "." With rearrangement and compaction, the passage translates to "I doubt, therefore I think, therefore I am," or in Latin, "dubito, ergo cogito, ergo sum."

He was born in Clermont-Ferrand and died aged 52 in Oullins.

Works

Notes

References

External links
 

1732 births
1785 deaths
French literary critics
French poets
Writers from Clermont-Ferrand
18th-century French writers
18th-century French male writers
Members of the Académie Française
French male poets
French male non-fiction writers